Andreas Klier (born 15 January 1976) is a retired German professional road racing cyclist. He competed professionally between 1996 and 2013. Klier moved into a managerial role with his final professional team, after announcing his retirement as a rider on 13 May 2013. On 15 August 2013, Klier admitted he used performance-enhancing drugs between 1999 and 2006. Born in Munich, Bavaria, Germany, Klier currently resides in the Balearic Island of Majorca. In April 2011, during a training ride, he avoided a collision with a car, from that moment onwards he had a bit of oak installed into his bike frame and thus could avoid accidents by touching wood. Bikes were sold with oak to raise money for the Plant for the Planet charity.

Career

Doping confession
On 15 August 2013, the United States Anti-Doping Agency (USADA) announced that Klier would be suspended for six months after admitting to doping during the period of 1999 to 2006. Later that day, the organization issued a statement confirming his acceptance to a six-month ban from  12 August 2013 to 18 February 2014. The action also included the stripping of all race results from 21 July 2005 onwards.  Klier released his own statement later that day, which expressed regret at his decision of "chose[ing] the wrong path." "Along the road to the top of the sport, many years ago, I chose the wrong path, and I have been very sorry for it ever since. To everyone both in and out of cycling including my family, the fans, the sponsors, the sport I love, my peers, – especially those who made the right choices – I am deeply sorry," he said.

Career achievements

Major results
Sources:

1998
 10th, Grand Prix Pino Cerami
1999
 10th, Overall, Tirreno–Adriatico
2000
 3rd, Circuit Franco-Belge
 7th, Gent–Wevelgem
 9th, E3 Harelbeke
2001
 6th, Sparkassen Giro Bochum
 7th, Grand Prix de l'Escaut
2002
 1st, Grote Prijs Jef Scherens
2003
 1st, Gent–Wevelgem
2004
 6th, Tour of Flanders
 7th, E3 Harelbeke
 10th, Gent–Wevelgem
2005
 2nd, E3 Prijs Vlaanderen
 2nd, Tour of Flanders
 4th, Overall, Tour of Saxony
 10th, Overall,  Tirreno–Adriatico

2005
8th, UCI Road Race Championships
9th, Overall,  Eneco Tour of Benelux
2006
9th, Tour of Flanders
2007
1st, Stage 13, Vuelta a España
6th, Overall, Tour of Qatar
2008
10th, GP Fina - Fayt-le-Franc
2009
5th, Overall, Tour of Qatar
5th, Gent–Wevelgem
7th, Omloop Het Nieuwsblad
2011
5th, Bayern-Rundfahrt

Grand Tour general classification results timeline

References

External links

Cycling Base: Andreas Klier

Garmin-Sharp: Andreas Klier

1976 births
Living people
German male cyclists
German Vuelta a España stage winners
Cyclists from Munich